Shiare is a village mountain settlement in the Breast Mountains in the Oti region of Ghana. The Oti Region is in the northern part of the Volta Region. Shiare is a part of Nkwanta South Municipal District.  It is noted that the village settlement is nine centuries old. It is north of the Oti Region in Ghana.  The village is known as 'The Hanging Village'.

History
Oral history says that the people of Shiare migrated from Ejisu in the Ashanti region. The Shiare the village is on and around the Breast Mountains in Ghana. They practice their traditional religion. The village is believed to be 900 years old.

Georgraphy
Shiare is about a 30-minute drive from Nkwanta, Ghana.

Economy
The villagers of Shiare are subsistence farmers. They grow cassava, yams, and some vegetables.

Culture
The Shiare people are Guans people. Their language is akyode. The village is over nine centuries old. The paramount seat Their homes are made of rocks and clay built on terraces around the Kwahu mountains. The villagers ethnic group is Kyode people. Their language is Guang people or Guans. The Chief of the Shiare is called Shiare Wura or Osulewura. It means king of Kyode kingdom. The paramount seat of the Kyode is in Shiare.
Their religion is traditionalists. The Holy Family Catholic Church is the only church in the village. Which was started 75 years ago.

Shiare has a waterfall which is their only source of water. Which is channeled through a stream. The waterfall is about 40 minutes away from the village.
The Shiare's primary occupation is farming. They also produce honey.

The typical traditional food is fufu made from yams. Which is pounded by two or three people working together.

The village has electricity.

Shiare has no senior high schools or tertiary institutions.

Gallery

See also
 Testing out Hydraulic Ram Pumps in "the Akyode Village"
 Shiare "The Hanging Village", in Ghana - full documentary
 The Hanging Village 
 Shiare weather
 Shiare
 Shiare Village
 Shiare Community
 Life in Shiare
 Hanging Village Waterfall in Ghana (Shiare)

References 

Villages in Ghana
Gha
Ghanaian culture
Kyode people